Jason Sklenar (born 27 March 1970) is a British biathlete. He competed at the 1992 Winter Olympics and the 2002 Winter Olympics.

References

External links
 

1970 births
Living people
British male biathletes
Olympic biathletes of Great Britain
Biathletes at the 1992 Winter Olympics
Biathletes at the 2002 Winter Olympics
Sportspeople from Cheltenham